John St Aubyn, 1st Baron St Levan  (23 October 1829 – 14 May 1908), known as Sir John St Aubyn, 2nd Baronet, from 1872 to 1887, was a British Liberal, and later Liberal Unionist, politician who sat in the House of Commons from 1858 until 1887 when he was raised to the peerage.

Early life
St Aubyn was the son of Sir Edward St Aubyn, 1st Baronet, of St Michael's Mount, Cornwall, and his wife Emma (née Knollys), daughter of General William Knollys. He was educated at Eton, and at Trinity College, Cambridge. St Aubyn was Hon. Colonel of the 3rd Bttn Duke of Cornwall's Light Infantry. He was also a Deputy Lieutenant and J.P. for Cornwall, and Deputy Special Warden of the Stannaries. He was president of the Royal Geological Society of Cornwall from 1891 to 1892.

Parliamentary service
St Aubyn was elected Member of Parliament for Cornwall West as a Liberal in 1858, a seat he held until 1885 when the constituency was replaced under the Redistribution of Seats Act 1885. In his original election address, according to The Times, he promised to vote for.:
abolition of Church Rates
for the fullest extent of education
strict economy of the public service
admission of Jews to Parliament
abolition of the property qualification
for the ballot, in the event of any constituency needing the protection of it
Whilst representing West Cornwall, he was always elected unopposed.

At the 1885 general election, St Aubyn was elected as MP for St Ives in a contest that was fiercely contested. "The fight was severe", according to The Times. He disagreed with William Ewart Gladstone over Irish Home Rule and sat as a Liberal Unionist from 1886 to 1887.  In the latter year St Aubyn was raised to the peerage as Baron St Levan, of St Michael's Mount in the County of Cornwall.

Marriage, children and death
Lord St Levan married Lady Elizabeth Clementina, daughter of John Townshend, 4th Marquess Townshend, in 1856. They had six sons and seven daughters  He died on 14 May 1908, aged 78. He was succeeded in his titles by his eldest son John (23 September 1857 – 1940). Lady St Levan died in 1910.

Notes

References 
Kidd, Charles, Williamson, David (editors). Debrett's Peerage and Baronetage (1990 edition). New York: St Martin's Press, 1990,

External links 
 

1829 births
1908 deaths
People educated at Eton College
Alumni of Trinity College, Cambridge
Duke of Cornwall's Light Infantry officers
Barons in the Peerage of the United Kingdom
Deputy Lieutenants of Cornwall
English justices of the peace
Politicians from Cornwall
Liberal Party (UK) MPs for English constituencies
Liberal Unionist Party MPs for English constituencies
Members of the Parliament of the United Kingdom for constituencies in Cornwall
UK MPs 1857–1859
UK MPs 1859–1865
UK MPs 1865–1868
UK MPs 1868–1874
UK MPs 1874–1880
UK MPs 1880–1885
UK MPs 1885–1886
UK MPs 1886–1892
UK MPs who were granted peerages
Presidents of the Royal Geological Society of Cornwall
Liberal Unionist Party peers
Members of the Parliament of the United Kingdom for St Ives
Peers of the United Kingdom created by Queen Victoria